Mercy Achieng Onyango (born 12 August 1992), known as Mercy Achieng, is a Kenyan footballer who plays for Thika Queens and the Kenya national team.

She played for Kenya at the 2016 Africa Women Cup of Nations.

She scored for Kenya in a 2017 COSAFA Women's Championship match against Swaziland.

See also
List of Kenya women's international footballers

References

1992 births
Living people
Kenyan women's footballers
Kenya women's international footballers
Women's association football midfielders